Anita Pistone (born 29 October 1976) is a track and field sprint athlete who competes internationally for Italy.

Biography
Pistone represented Italy at the 2008 Summer Olympics in Beijing. She competed at the 100 metres sprint and placed second in her first round heat after Muna Lee in a time of 11.43. She qualified for the second round in which she failed to qualify for the semi finals as her time of 11.56 was the sixth time of her race. Together with Vincenza Calì, Giulia Arcioni and Audrey Alloh she also took part in the 4x100 metres relay. In their first round heat they were however disqualified and eliminated for the final.

National records
 4×100 metres relay: 43.04 ( Annecy, 21 June 2008) - with Audrey Alloh, Giulia Arcioni, Vincenza Calì - current holder

Achievements

See also
 Italy national relay team
 Italian all-time lists - 4x100 metres relay

References

External links
 

1976 births
Living people
Italian female sprinters
Olympic athletes of Italy
Athletes (track and field) at the 2008 Summer Olympics
Sportspeople from Catania
Mediterranean Games silver medalists for Italy
Mediterranean Games medalists in athletics
Athletes (track and field) at the 2001 Mediterranean Games
Athletes (track and field) at the 2009 Mediterranean Games
Olympic female sprinters
20th-century Italian women
21st-century Italian women